A parathyroid neoplasm is a tumor of the parathyroid gland.

Types include:
 Parathyroid adenoma
 Parathyroid carcinoma

References

External links 

Endocrine neoplasia